, a Japanese word literally meaning "extreme path" or "wicked" and commonly used as a synonym for yakuza, may refer to:

 Gokudo the Adventurer (1991), a light novel series by Usagi Nakamura later adapted into a manga (1995) and anime (1999)
 Gozu (2003), horror anthology film by Takashi Miike, released in Japan as Gokudō Kyōfu dai-Gekijō
 The Raid 2 (2014), Indonesian film directed by Welsh filmmaker Gareth Evans, released in Japan as The Raid: Gokudo
 Rainy Dog (1997), the second film in the Black Triad trilogy by Takashi Miike, released in Japan as Gokudô Kuroshakai
 Yakuza Apocalypse (2015), Japanese film by Takashi Miike, released in Japan as Gokudō Daisensō